Zoharkuh (also Romanized as Ẕoharkūh; also known as Zārkūh) is a village in Khenaman Rural District, in the Central District of Rafsanjan County, Kerman Province, Iran. At the 2006 census, its population was 13, in 6 families.

References 

Populated places in Rafsanjan County